This is a list of foreign ministers in 2013.

Africa
 Algeria
Mourad Medelci (2007–2013)
Ramtane Lamamra (2013–2017)
 Angola - Georges Rebelo Chicoti (2010–2017)
 Benin - Nassirou Bako Arifari (2011–2015)
 Botswana - Phandu Skelemani (2008–2014)
 Burkina Faso - Djibril Bassolé (2011–2014)
 Burundi - Laurent Kavakure (2011–2015)
 Cameroon - Pierre Moukoko Mbonjo (2011–2015)
 Cape Verde - Jorge Borges (2011–2014)
 Central African Republic 
Antoine Gambi (2009–2013)
Parfait Anicet Mbay (2013)
Charles Armel Doubane (2013)
Léonie Banga-Bothy (2013–2014)
 Chad - Moussa Faki (2008–2017)
 Comoros
Mohamed Bakri Ben Abdoulfatah Charif (2011–2013)
El-Anrif Said Hassane (2013–2015)
 Republic of Congo - Basile Ikouébé (2007–2015)
 Democratic Republic of Congo - Raymond Tshibanda (2012–2016)
 Côte d'Ivoire - Charles Koffi Diby (2012–2016)
 Djibouti - Mahamoud Ali Youssouf (2005–present)
 Egypt
Mohamed Kamel Amr (2011–2013)
Nabil Fahmi (2013–2014)
 Equatorial Guinea - Agapito Mba Mokuy (2012–2018)
 Eritrea - Osman Saleh Mohammed (2007–present)
 Ethiopia - Tedros Adhanom (2012–2016)
 Gabon - Emmanuel Issoze-Ngondet (2012–2016)
 The Gambia -
 Susan Waffa-Ogoo (2012–2013)
 Aboubacar Senghore (2013–2014)
 Ghana -
 Muhammad Mumuni (2009–2013)
 Hanna Tetteh (2013–2017)
 Guinea - François Lonseny Fall (2012–2016)
 Guinea-Bissau -
 Faustino Imbali (2012–2013)
 Fernando Delfim da Silva (2013–2014)
 Kenya -
 Sam Ongeri (2012–2013)
 Amina Mohamed (2013–2018)
 Lesotho - Mohlabi Tsekoa (2007–2015)
 Liberia - Augustine Kpehe Ngafuan (2012–2015)
 Libya - Mohammed Abdelaziz (2012–2014)
 Madagascar -
 Pierrot Rajaonarivelo (2011–2013)
 Ulrich Andriantiana (acting) (2013–2014)
 Malawi - Ephraim Chiume (2012–2014)
 Mali 
Tieman Coulibaly (2012–2013)
Zahabi Ould Sidi Mohamed (2013–2014)
 Azawad -
Hama Ag Mahmoud  (2012-2013)
Ibrahim Ag Mohamed Assaleh (2013)
 Mauritania
Hamadi Ould Baba Ould Hamadi (2011–2013)
Ahmed Ould Teguedi (2013–2015)
 Mauritius - Arvin Boolell (2008–2014)
 Morocco
Saadeddine Othmani (2012–2013)
Salaheddine Mezouar (2013–2017)
 Western Sahara - Mohamed Salem Ould Salek (1998–2023)
 Mozambique - Oldemiro Balói (2008–2017)
 Namibia - Netumbo Nandi-Ndaitwah (2012–present)
 Niger - Mohamed Bazoum (2011–2015)
 Nigeria
Olugbenga Ashiru (2011–2013)
Viola Onwuliri (acting) (2013–2014)
 Rwanda - Louise Mushikiwabo (2009–2018)
 São Tomé and Príncipe - Natália Pedro da Costa Umbelina Neto (2012–2014)
 Senegal - Mankeur Ndiaye (2012–2017)
 Seychelles - Jean-Paul Adam (2010–2015)
 Sierra Leone - Samura Kamara (2012–2017)
 Somalia - Fowsiyo Yussuf Haji Aadan (2012–2014)
 Somaliland
Mohammad Abdullahi Omar (2010–2013)
Mohamed Yonis (2013–2015)
 Puntland - Daud Mohamed Omar (2010–2014)
 South Africa - Maite Nkoana-Mashabane (2009–2018)
 South Sudan
Nhial Deng Nhial (2011–2013)
Charles Manyang d'Awol (acting) (2013)
Barnaba Marial Benjamin (2013–2016)
 Sudan - Ali Karti (2010–2015)
 Swaziland
Mtiti Fakudze (2011–2013)
Sotsha Dlamini (acting) (2013)
Mgwagwa Gamedze (2013–2018)
 Tanzania – Bernard Membe (2007–2015)
 Togo -
 Elliott Ohin (2010–2013)
 Robert Dussey (2013–present)
 Tunisia -
 Rafik Abdessalem (2011–2013)
 Othman Jerandi (2013–2014)
 Uganda - Sam Kutesa (2005–present)
 Zambia -
 Given Lubinda (2012–2013)
 Effron Lungu (2013)
 Wilbur Simuusa (2013–2014)
 Zimbabwe - Simbarashe Mumbengegwi (2005–2017)

Asia
 Afghanistan -
 Zalmai Rassoul (2010–2013)
 Ahmad Moqbel Zarar (2013–2014)
 Armenia - Eduard Nalbandyan (2008–2018)
 Azerbaijan - Elmar Mammadyarov (2004–2020)
 Nagorno-Karabakh - Karen Mirzoyan (2012–2017)
 Bahrain - Sheikh Khalid ibn Ahmad Al Khalifah (2005–2020)
 Bangladesh
Dipu Moni (2009–2013)
Abul Hassan Mahmud Ali (2013–2014)
 Bhutan 
Ugyen Tshering (2008–2013)
Rinzin Dorji (2013–2015)
 Brunei - Pengiran Muda Mohamed Bolkiah (1984–2015)
 Cambodia - Hor Namhong (1998–2016)
 China
Yang Jiechi (2007–2013)
Wang Yi (2013–present)
 East Timor - José Luís Guterres (2012–2015)
 Georgia - Maia Panjikidze (2012–2014)
 Abkhazia - Viacheslav Chirikba (2011–2016)
 South Ossetia - David Sanakoyev (2012–2015)
 India - Salman Khurshid (2012–2014)
 Indonesia - Marty Natalegawa (2009–2014)
 Iran 
Ali Akbar Salehi (2010–2013)
Mohammad Javad Zarif (2013–2021)
 Iraq - Hoshyar Zebari (2003–2014)
 Kurdistan - Falah Mustafa Bakir (2006–2019)
 Israel
Benjamin Netanyahu (2012–2013)
Avigdor Lieberman (2013–2015)
 Palestinian Authority - Riyad al-Maliki (2007–present)
 Gaza Strip (in rebellion against the Palestinian National Authority) - Ismail Haniyeh (acting) (2012–present)
 Japan - Fumio Kishida (2012–2017)
 Jordan - Nasser Judeh (2009–2017)
 Kazakhstan – Erlan Idrissov (2012–2016)
 North Korea - Pak Ui-chun (2007–2014)
 South Korea 
Kim Sung-hwan (2010–2013)
Yun Byung-se (2013–2017)
 Kuwait - Sheikh Sabah Al-Khalid Al-Sabah (2011–2019)
 Kyrgyzstan - Erlan Abdyldayev (2012–2018)
 Laos - Thongloun Sisoulith (2006–2016)
 Lebanon - Adnan Mansour (2011–2014)
 Malaysia - Anifah Aman (2009–2018)
 Maldives -
 Abdul Samad Abdulla (2012–2013)
 Asim Ahmed (acting) (2013)
 Mariyam Shakeela (acting) (2013)
 Dunya Maumoon (2013–2016)
 Mongolia - Luvsanvandan Bold (2012–2014)
 Myanmar - Wunna Maung Lwin (2011–2016)
 Nepal
Narayan Kaji Shrestha (2011–2013)
Madhav Prasad Ghimire (2013–2014)
 Oman - Yusuf bin Alawi bin Abdullah (1982–2020)
 Pakistan 
Hina Rabbani Khar (2011–2013)
 Sartaj Aziz (2013–2017) 
 Philippines - Albert del Rosario (2011–2016)
 Qatar 
Sheikh Hamad bin Jassim bin Jaber Al Thani (1992–2013)
Khalid bin Mohammad Al Attiyah (2013–2016)

 Saudi Arabia - Prince Saud bin Faisal bin Abdulaziz Al Saud (1975–2015)
 Singapore - K. Shanmugam (2011–2015)
 Sri Lanka - G. L. Peiris (2010–2015)
 Syria - Walid Muallem (2006–2020)
 Taiwan - David Lin (2012–2016)
 Tajikistan -
 Khamrokhon Zaripov (2006–2013)
 Sirodjidin Aslov (2013–present)
 Thailand - Surapong Tovichakchaikul (2011–2014)
 Turkey - Ahmet Davutoğlu (2009–2014)
 Turkmenistan - Raşit Meredow (2001–present)
 United Arab Emirates - Sheikh Abdullah bin Zayed Al Nahyan (2006–present)
 Uzbekistan - Abdulaziz Komilov (2012–present)
 Vietnam - Phạm Bình Minh (2011–2021)
 Yemen - Abu Bakr al-Qirbi (2001–2014)

Europe
 Albania 
Edmond Panariti (2012–2013)
Aldo Bumçi (2013)
Ditmir Bushati (2013–2019)
 Andorra - Gilbert Saboya Sunyé (2011–2017)
 Austria -
 Michael Spindelegger (2008–2013)
 Sebastian Kurz (2013–2017)
 Belarus - Vladimir Makei (2012–present)
 Belgium - Didier Reynders (2011–2019)
 Brussels-Capital Region
Jean-Luc Vanraes (2009–2013)
Guy Vanhengel (2013–2019)
 Flanders - Kris Peeters (2008–2014)
  Wallonia - Rudy Demotte (2009–2014)
 Bosnia and Herzegovina - Zlatko Lagumdžija (2012–2015)
 Bulgaria -
 Nickolay Mladenov (2010–2013)
 Marin Raykov (acting) (2013)
 Kristian Vigenin (2013–2014)
 Croatia - Vesna Pusić (2011–2016)
 Cyprus 
Erato Kozakou-Marcoullis (2011–2013)
Ioannis Kasoulidis (2013–2018)
 Northern Cyprus
Hüseyin Özgürgün (2009–2013)
Kutlay Erk (2013)
Özdil Nami (2013–2015)
 Czech Republic 
Karel Schwarzenberg (2010–2013)
Jan Kohout (2013–2014)
 Denmark -
 Villy Søvndal (2011–2013)
 Holger K. Nielsen (2013–2014)
 Greenland 
Kuupik Kleist (2009–2013)
Aleqa Hammond (2013–2014)
 Faroe Islands - Kaj Leo Johannesen (2011–2015)
 Estonia - Urmas Paet (2005–2014)
 Finland - Erkki Tuomioja (2011–2015)
 France - Laurent Fabius (2012–2016)
 Germany -
 Guido Westerwelle (2009–2013)
 Frank-Walter Steinmeier (2013–2017)
 Greece 
Dimitris Avramopoulos (2012–2013)
Evangelos Venizelos (2013–2015)
 Hungary - János Martonyi (2010–2014)
 Iceland
Össur Skarphéðinsson (2009–2013)
Gunnar Bragi Sveinsson (2013–2016)
 Ireland - Eamon Gilmore (2011–2014)
 Italy -
 Giulio Terzi di Sant'Agata (2011–2013)
 Mario Monti (acting) (2013)
 Emma Bonino (2013–2014)
 Latvia - Edgars Rinkēvičs (2011–present)
 Liechtenstein - Aurelia Frick (2009–2019)
 Lithuania - Linas Antanas Linkevičius (2012–2020)
 Luxembourg - Jean Asselborn (2004–present)
 Macedonia - Nikola Poposki (2011–2017)
 Malta 
Francis Zammit Dimech (2012–2013)
George Vella (2013–2017)
 Moldova 
Iurie Leancă (2009–2013)
Natalia Gherman (2013–2016)
 Transnistria - Nina Shtanski (2012–2015)
 Gagauzia - Svetlana Gradinari (2013–2015)
 Monaco - José Badia (2011–2015)
 Montenegro - Igor Lukšić (2012–2016)
 Netherlands - Frans Timmermans (2012–2014)
 Norway -
 Espen Barth Eide (2012–2013)
 Børge Brende (2013–2017)
 Poland - Radosław Sikorski (2007–2014)
 Portugal -
 Paulo Portas (2011–2013)
 Rui Machete (2013–2015)
 Romania - Titus Corlăţean (2012–2014)
 Russia - Sergey Lavrov (2004–present)
 San Marino - Pasquale Valentini (2012–2016)
 Serbia - Ivan Mrkić (2012–2014)
 Kosovo - Enver Hoxhaj (2011–2014)
 Slovakia - Miroslav Lajčák (2012–2020)
 Slovenia - Karl Erjavec (2012–2018)
 Spain - José Manuel García-Margallo (2011–2016)
 Catalonia - Francesc Homs Molist (2012–2015)
 Sweden - Carl Bildt (2006–2014)
 Switzerland - Didier Burkhalter (2012–2017)

 Ukraine - Leonid Kozhara (2012–2014)
 United Kingdom - William Hague (2010–2014)
 Scotland - Fiona Hyslop (2009–2020)
 Jersey - Sir Philip Bailhache (2013–2018)
 Vatican City - Archbishop Dominique Mamberti (2006–2014)

North America and the Caribbean
 Antigua and Barbuda - Baldwin Spencer (2005–2014)
 The Bahamas - Fred Mitchell (2012–2017)
 Barbados - Maxine McClean (2008–2018)
 Belize - Wilfred Elrington (2008–2020)
 Canada - John Baird (2011–2015)
 Quebec - Jean-François Lisée (2012–2014)
 Costa Rica - Enrique Castillo (2011–2014)
 Cuba - Bruno Rodríguez Parrilla (2009–present)
 Dominica - Roosevelt Skerrit (2010–2014)
 Dominican Republic - Carlos Morales Troncoso (2004–2014)
 El Salvador -
 Hugo Martínez (2009–2013)
 Jaime Miranda (2013–2014)
 Grenada -
 Tillman Thomas (2012–2013)
 Nickolas Steele (2013–2014)
 Guatemala
Harold Caballeros (2012–2013)
Fernando Carrera (2013–2014)
 Haiti - Pierre Richard Casimir (2012–2014)
 Honduras 
Arturo Corrales (2011–2013)
Mireya Agüero (2013–2015)
 Jamaica - Arnold Nicholson (2012–2016)
 Mexico - José Antonio Meade Kuribreña (2012–2015)
 Nicaragua - Samuel Santos López (2007–2017)
 Panama 
Rómulo Roux (2012–2013)
Fernando Núñez Fábrega (2013–2014)
 Puerto Rico –
Kenneth McClintock (2009–2013)
David Bernier (2013–2015)
 Saint Kitts and Nevis -
 Sam Condor (2010–2013)
 Patrice Nisbett (2013–2015)
 Saint Lucia - Alva Baptiste (2011–2016)
 Saint Vincent and the Grenadines
Douglas Slater (2010–2013)
Camillo Gonsalves (2013–2015)
 Trinidad and Tobago - Winston Dookeran (2012–2015)
 United States of America 
Hillary Clinton (2009–2013)
John Kerry (2013–2017)

Oceania
 Australia
Bob Carr (2012–2013)
Julie Bishop (2013–2018)
 Fiji - Ratu Inoke Kubuabola   (2009–2016)
 French Polynesia -
 Oscar Temaru (2011–2013)
 Gaston Flosse (2013–2014)
 Kiribati - Anote Tong (2003–2016)
 Marshall Islands - Phillip H. Muller (2012–2014)
 Micronesia - Lorin S. Robert (2007–2019)
 Nauru 
Kieren Keke (2012–2013)
Sprent Dabwido (2013)
Roland Kun (2013)
Sprent Dabwido (2013)
Baron Waqa (2013–2019)
 New Zealand - Murray McCully (2008–2017)
 Cook Islands
Tom Marsters (2010–2013) 
Henry Puna (2013–2020) 
 Niue - Toke Talagi (2008–2020)
 Tokelau 
Kerisiano Kalolo (2012–2013)
Salesio Lui (2013–2014)
 Palau
Victor Yano (2010–2013)
Billy Kuartei (2013–2017)
 Papua New Guinea - Rimbink Pato (2012–2019)
 Samoa - Tuilaepa Aiono Sailele Malielegaoi (1998–2021)
 Solomon Islands - Clay Forau Soalaoi (2012–2014)
 Tonga - Sialeʻataongo Tuʻivakanō (2010–2014)
 Tuvalu 
Apisai Ielemia (2010–2013)
Taukelina Finikaso (2013–2019)
 Vanuatu
 Alfred Carlot (2011–2013)
 Edward Natapei (2013–2014)

South America
 Argentina - Héctor Timerman (2010–2015)
 Bolivia - David Choquehuanca (2006–2017)
 Brazil -
 Antonio Patriota (2011–2013)
 Luiz Alberto Figueiredo (2013–2015)
 Chile - Alfredo Moreno Charme (2010–2014)
 Colombia - María Ángela Holguín (2010–2018)
 Ecuador - Ricardo Patiño (2010–2016)
 Guyana - Carolyn Rodrigues (2008–2015)
 Paraguay 
José Félix Fernández Estigarribia (2012–2013)
Eladio Loizaga (2013–2018)
 Peru -
 Rafael Roncagliolo (2011–2013)
 Eda Rivas (2013–2014)
 Suriname - Winston Lackin (2010–2015)
 Uruguay - Luis Almagro (2010–2015)
 Venezuela
 Nicolás Maduro (2006–2013)
 Elías Jaua (2013–2014)

References

Foreign ministers
2013 in international relations
Foreign ministers
2013